The Great West Conference men's basketball tournament was the conference championship tournament in basketball for the Great West Conference. The tournament was held every year between 2010 and 2013. It was a single-elimination tournament and seeding was based on regular season records. The winner, declared conference champion, received the conference's automatic bid to the CollegeInsider.com Postseason Tournament.

History

Winners by school

¹ former member of Great West Conference

References

External links
 Great West Conference 

 
Recurring sporting events established in 2010
Recurring events disestablished in 2013